Joanna Ruth White (born January 1964) is a British Labour Party politician who currently serves as the Deputy Leader of Bassetlaw District Council. In 2022, White was selected by the Labour Party as the Parliamentary candidate for Bassetlaw, the constituency represented by her husband John Mann, Baron Mann from 2001 until 2019.

Early life and career
White was born in Stamford, Lincolnshire in 1964. White has an identical twin sister, Deb Davies, who is also a Labour councillor in Newport, Wales.

Political career
White was elected to Bassetlaw District Council in 2012, representing Worksop East ward. White became Deputy Leader of the council in 2015. In 2012, White received a dead bird in the post and has also received rape threats which have been attributed to her husband's position on anti-Semitism within the Labour Party.

In 2022, White was selected by the Labour Party as their Parliamentary candidate for Bassetlaw, the same constituency represented by her husband, John Mann from 2001 until 2019.

Personal life
White married John Mann in July 1986 in Leeds and was employed by her husband as a part-time office manager during his tenure as Member of Parliament for Bassetlaw. The couple have two adult daughters and a son.

References

1964 births
British identical twins
Living people
Labour Party (UK) councillors